WWOW (1360 AM) is an oldies formatted broadcast radio station licensed to Conneaut, Ohio, serving Northwest Pennsylvania and Northeast Ohio.  WWOW is owned and operated by Matthew Jarvi, through licensee Lake Effect Media.
Transmitter facilities are located on Middle Road in Conneaut, Ohio.

History
WWOW first launched in 1959 with the original call letters still used to this day.  The station operated at that time with a daytime-only power of 500 watts, with studios and offices at 211 Main Street in Conneaut, Ohio.  The construction permit for WWOW was first issued in November 1957.
In 1967, WWOW applied for pre-sunrise authorization, allowing it to sign on two hours prior to local sunrise.  This petition was challenged by Jupiter Broadcasting, licensee of WSAI.  The challenge was denied by the FCC.

This station started out as a rock 'n' roll, top 40s station and had a lot of following with Kenneth Vaughn as veteran news director for 33 yrs.  Early DJs were names like Larry "Spyder" Snyder, Paul Allen, Bud "Stinky" Steiger and numerous others.   Many locals also had their chance at being a DJ too, and filled in on weekends, holidays, etc.

Original owner was Lew Skully, from Youngstown, Ohio.  In July 1970, Skully sold the station to Contemporary Media.  The five shareholders of Contemporary Media transferred control of the license to Doyle Flurry and Tom Childs in October 1979.  The FCC approved the transfer by the end of the year.  By 1985, studios had moved from the Main Street location to Conneaut Plaza on Route 20 west and the station adopted a country format.  By 1990, the station moved back to downtown Conneaut at 239 Broad Street (near its present location) and began adding oldies and farm programming to its country music format.

The station has switched from talk, to oldies, to Catholic religious and back to oldies since May 27, 2005.

Since 2011, WWOW has been operating as Boomer Tunes Radio, "The Music of a Generation" on 1360 WOW. 1360 WOW has also expanded its sports coverage significantly by carrying the Columbus Blue Jackets and Conneaut Spartans football and boys basketball.

External links
1360 WOW! Online
FCC History Cards for WWOW
Broadcasting and Cable Yearbook 1985
Broadcasting and Cable Yearbook 1990
Broadcasting and Cable Yearbook 1995
Broadcasting and Cable Yearbook 2000

WOW
Mass media in Ashtabula County, Ohio